Schönbusch or Schoenbusch refers to:
Schönbusch (Königsberg)
 Schloss and Park Schönbusch (Aschaffenburg)
Stadion am Schönbusch, venue for Viktoria Aschaffenburg